Baintala Union is a Union Parishad under Rampal Upazila of Bagerhat District in the division of Khulna, Bangladesh. It has an area of 34.40 km2 (13.28 sq mi) and a population of 24,223.

References

Unions of Rampal Upazila
Unions of Bagerhat District
Unions of Khulna Division